In Marxist theory, a new democratic society will arise through the organised actions of an international working class enfranchising the entire population and freeing up humans to act without being bound by the labour market. There would be little, if any, need for a state, the goal of which was to enforce the alienation of labor. Karl Marx and Friedrich Engels stated in The Communist Manifesto and later works that "the first step in the revolution by the working class, is to raise the proletariat to the position of ruling class, to win the battle for democracy" and universal suffrage, being "one of the first and most important tasks of the militant proletariat". As Marx wrote in his Critique of the Gotha Program, "between capitalist and communist society there lies the period of the revolutionary transformation of the one into the other. Corresponding to this is also a political transition period in which the state can be nothing but the revolutionary dictatorship of the proletariat". He allowed for the possibility of peaceful transition in some countries with strong democratic institutional structures (such as Britain, the US and the Netherlands), but suggested that in other countries in which workers can not "attain their goal by peaceful means" the "lever of our revolution must be force", stating that the working people had the right to revolt if they were denied political expression. In response to the question "What will be the course of this revolution?" in Principles of Communism, Friedrich Engels wrote: 

While Marxists propose replacing the bourgeois state with a proletarian semi-state through revolution (dictatorship of the proletariat), which would eventually wither away, anarchists warn that the state must be abolished along with capitalism. Nonetheless, the desired end results, a stateless, communal society, are the same.

Soviet Union and Bolshevism 
In the 19th century, The Communist Manifesto (1848) by Karl Marx and Friedrich Engels called for the international political unification of the European working classes in order to achieve a Communist revolution; and proposed that, because the socio-economic organization of communism was of a higher form than that of capitalism, a workers' revolution would first occur in the economically advanced, industrialized countries. Marxist social democracy was strongest in Germany throughout the 19th century, and the Social Democratic Party of Germany inspired Lenin and other Russian Marxists.

During the revolutionary ferment of the Russian Revolution of 1905 and 1917, there arose working-class grassroots attempts of direct democracy with Soviets (Russian for "council"). According to Lenin and other theorists of the Soviet Union, the soviets represent the democratic will of the working class and are thus the embodiment of the dictatorship of the proletariat. Lenin and the Bolsheviks saw the soviet as the basic organizing unit of society in a communist system and supported this form of democracy. Thus, the results of the long-awaited Constituent Assembly election in 1917, which Lenin's Bolshevik Party lost to the Socialist Revolutionary Party, were nullified when the Constituent Assembly was disbanded in January 1918.

Functionally, the Leninist vanguard party was to provide the working class with the political consciousness (education and organisation) and revolutionary leadership necessary to depose capitalism in Imperial Russia. After the October Revolution of 1917, Leninism was the dominant version of Marxism in Russia, and, in establishing soviet democracy, the Bolshevik régime suppressed socialists who opposed the revolution, such as the Mensheviks and factions of the Socialist Revolutionary Party.

In November 1917, Lenin issued the Decree on Workers' Control, which called on the workers of each enterprise to establish an elected committee to monitor their enterprise's management. That month they also issued an order requisitioning the country's gold, and nationalised the banks, which Lenin saw as a major step toward socialism. In December, Sovnarkom established a Supreme Council of the National Economy (VSNKh), which had authority over industry, banking, agriculture, and trade. In early 1918, Sovnarkom cancelled all foreign debts and refused to pay interest owed on them. In April 1918, it nationalised foreign trade, establishing a state monopoly on imports and exports. In June 1918, it decreed nationalisation of public utilities, railways, engineering, textiles, metallurgy, and mining, although often these were state-owned in name only. Full-scale nationalisation did not take place until November 1920, when small-scale industrial enterprises were brought under state control.

A faction of the Bolsheviks known as the "Left Communists" criticised Sovnarkom's economic policy as too moderate; they wanted nationalisation of all industry, agriculture, trade, finance, transport, and communication. Lenin believed that this was impractical at that stage, and that the government should only nationalise Russia's large-scale capitalist enterprises, such as the banks, railways, larger landed estates, and larger factories and mines, allowing smaller businesses to operate privately until they grew large enough to be successfully nationalised. Lenin also disagreed with the Left Communists about economic organisation; in June 1918, he argued that centralised economic control of industry was needed, whereas Left Communists wanted the economic control of each factory to be completely decentralized, a syndicalist approach that Lenin considered detrimental to the cause of socialism.

Adopting a left libertarian perspective, both the Left Communists and some factions in the Communist Party critiqued the decline of democratic institutions in Russia. Internationally, some socialists decried Lenin's regime and denied that he was establishing socialism; in particular, they highlighted the lack of widespread political participation, popular consultation, and industrial democracy. In late 1918, the Czech-Austrian Marxist Karl Kautsky authored an anti-Leninist pamphlet condemning the October Revolution for not first transitioning towards capitalism, to which Lenin published a vociferous reply.

Chinese Communist Party perspective 

Beginning in 2019, the Chinese Communist Party developed the concept of "whole-process democracy" which by 2021 was termed "whole-process people's democracy" (the addition of "people's" emphasized a connection to the Maoist concept of the mass line). Under this view, a "real and effective socialist democracy" can be presented as a series of four paired relationships: 1) “process democracy” (过程民主) and “achievement democracy” (成果民主), 2) “procedural democracy” (程序民主) and “substantive democracy” (实质民主), 3) “direct democracy” (直接民主) and “indirect democracy” (间接民主), and 4) “people’s democracy” (人民民主) and the “will of the state” (国家意志). Whole-process people's democracy is a primarily consequentialist view, in which the most important criterion for evaluating the success of democracy is whether democracy can "solve the people's real problems," while a system in which "the people are awakened only for voting" is not truly democratic. As a result, whole-process people's democracy critiques liberal democracy for its excessive focus on procedure.

See also 
 Council democracy
 Council communism
 Criticisms of communist regimes
 Criticisms of Marxism
 Luxemburgism
 People's democracy (Marxism–Leninism)
 Revolutionary committee (China)
 Soviet republic
 Workers' council

Notes

Works cited

 
 
 
 
 
 
 
 
 
 

Democracy
Marxism
Marxist theory
Political ideologies
Political theories
Trotskyism